SCSI target devices provide a number of SCSI mode pages.  These can be interrogated by a MODE SENSE command and set by a MODE SELECT command.  The MODE SENSE commands and the mode page formats include a 6-bit page code field, allowing for 64 possible mode pages.  When the number of pages approached this limit, an eight-bit subpage code field was added.  A description of many of these page codes is included below.  Note that any given SCSI device type will only support a subset of the possible page codes, and some page codes may have different meanings for different devices.

List of SCSI mode page codes

References 

SCSI